The  Cleveland Indians season was the 47th in franchise history. On July 5, Larry Doby broke the American League color barrier. Doby was signed by the Indians by owner and team president Bill Veeck in July, 11 weeks after Jackie Robinson appeared with the Brooklyn Dodgers in the National League. In his rookie season, Doby went 5-for-32 (.156) in 29 games.

Offseason 
 November 1, 1946: Gus Zernial was drafted by the Indians from the Atlanta Crackers in the 1946 rule 5 draft.

Regular season 
 July 5: In a game against the Chicago White Sox, Larry Doby became the first black player to appear in an American League game. Doby pinch-hit for pitcher Bryan Stephens in the seventh inning and struck out against Earl Harrist.

Season standings

Record vs. opponents

Notable transactions 
 April 2, 1947: Catfish Metkovich was purchased by the Indians from the Boston Red Sox.
 April 23, 1947: Gus Zernial was purchased from the Indians by the Chicago White Sox.

Roster

Player stats

Batting

Starters by position 
Note: Pos = Position; G = Games played; AB = At bats; H = Hits; Avg. = Batting average; HR = Home runs; RBI = Runs batted in

Other batters 
Note: G = Games played; AB = At bats; H = Hits; Avg. = Batting average; HR = Home runs; RBI = Runs batted in

Pitching

Starting pitchers 
Note: G = Games pitched; IP = Innings pitched; W = Wins; L = Losses; ERA = Earned run average; SO = Strikeouts

Other pitchers 
Note: G = Games pitched; IP = Innings pitched; W = Wins; L = Losses; ERA = Earned run average; SO = Strikeouts

Relief pitchers 
Note: G = Games pitched; W = Wins; L = Losses; SV = Saves; ERA = Earned run average; SO = Strikeouts

Awards and honors 

All-Star Game

Lou Boudreau, Shortstop, starter

Bob Feller, Pitcher (replaced due to injury)

Joe Gordon, Second baseman, starter

Jim Hegan, Catcher, reserve

Farm system

Notes

References 
1947 Cleveland Indians at Baseball Reference
1947 Cleveland Indians at Baseball Almanac

Cleveland Indians seasons
Cleveland Indians season
Cleveland Indians